Jovica "Jovo" Simanić (Serbian Cyrillic: Јовица "Јово" Симанић; born 8 August 1965) is a Serbian retired footballer who played as a central defender.

Football career
Born in Zrenjanin in the Socialist Federal Republic of Yugoslavia, Simanić started and ended his 11-year professional career with hometown club FK Proleter Zrenjanin, scoring 16 goals, but also played abroad in Germany and Portugal. In January 1992, he joined VfB Stuttgart, appearing almost exclusively for the reserve team. On 30 September 1992, in his only appearance for the main squad, a UEFA Champions League play-off match against Leeds United, he was introduced in the last minutes of the 1–4 away loss by manager Christoph Daum, causing Stuttgart to play with one foreign player too many; the Germans would have won on the away goals rule but, after being punished with a 0–3 defeat instead, the two teams had to play a third match, which ended 2–1 for the English side.

Simanić then represented S.L. Benfica, being called to the bench twice and Boavista in six Primeira Liga games, after which he competed in the country's second (F.C. Famalicão) and third divisions for A.D. Ovarense. He returned to his country aged 32 and played for Proleter, retiring from football three years later.

References

External links

1965 births
Living people
Sportspeople from Zrenjanin
Yugoslav footballers
Serbian footballers
Association football defenders
Yugoslav First League players
Serbian SuperLiga players
FK Proleter Zrenjanin players
VfB Stuttgart II players
VfB Stuttgart players
Primeira Liga players
Liga Portugal 2 players
Segunda Divisão players
S.L. Benfica footballers
Boavista F.C. players
F.C. Famalicão players
A.D. Ovarense players
Serbian expatriate footballers
Expatriate footballers in Germany
Expatriate footballers in Portugal
Serbian expatriate sportspeople in Germany
Serbian expatriate sportspeople in Portugal